Johnny Hodges and His Strings Play the Prettiest Gershwin is an album by saxophonist Johnny Hodges accompanied by an orchestra performing Gershwin tunes recorded in Stuttgart in 1958 for the Verve label.

Reception

The AllMusic reviewer commented: "All of these performances, like most of the music in the latter day Johnny Hodges discography, combine the elegant tonal ligatures of swing and cool".

Track listing 
All compositions by George and Ira Gershwin, except as indicated.
 "Love Is Here to Stay" - 2:44
 "Nice Work If You Can Get It" - 3:13
 "'S Wonderful" - 2:51 
 "Summertime" (George Gershwin, Ira Gershwin, DuBose Heyward) - 2:59
 "Soon" - 2:58
 "But Not for Me" - 2:43
 "Somebody Loves Me" (George Gershwin, Ballard MacDonald, Buddy DeSylva) - 2:31 	
 "They Can't Take That Away from Me" - 3:16
 "Someone to Watch over Me" - 3:14
 "The Man I Love" - 2:57
 "Oh, Lady Be Good!" - 2:38
 "They All Laughed" - 2:50

Personnel 
Johnny Hodges - alto saxophone
Horst Jankowski - piano
Unidentified string section arranged by Russ Garcia and conducted by Wolfram Röhrig

References 

1958 albums
Johnny Hodges albums
Albums arranged by Russell Garcia (composer)
Verve Records albums